Povilonis is a Lithuanian surname. Notable people with the surname include:
Nick Povilonis, American musician, member of Christian punk and ska band No Lost Cause
Liudvikas Povilonis (1910-1990), Lithuanian priest, archbishop 

Lithuanian-language surnames